This is an incomplete list of notable bulletin board systems:


Amateur Action BBS
French Connection BBS - famous California dating BBS written by Hal Finney and Stephen Cohen started in 1979
CBBS – the first BBS on record, established 1978
Celco 51 Operation Cybersnare – United States Secret Service Cellular Fraud sting BBS
Demon Roach Underground – popular hacker BBS and former home of the CULT OF THE DEAD COW
ExecPC BBS – America's largest dial-up BBS through the late 1980s
Forum 80 – based in Kingston upon Hull, the UK's first BBS, started in 1980
GLIB Gay and Lesbian Information Bureau – BBS based in the D.C. Metro-area offering information and support services to the gay and lesbian community in the 1980s and 90s. Also operated "GayComm Talk About Aids" FidoNet echo.
ISCABBS – largest worldwide BBS, formerly located at the University of Iowa, and still running as of 2019.
MindVox – famous New York based BBS and internet service provider founded by members of Legion of Doom
Monochrome BBS – BBS based in the UK, founded in 1990 and still running 2018
OSUNY – legendary old-school hack/phreak BBS from the 1980s
 pcmicro
Plover-NET – early hacker BBS, origins of hacker group Legion of Doom
PTT Bulletin Board System – largest BBS in Taiwan, still the most popular online forum in 2018
Purple Ocean – one of the largest North American Gaming BBS's of in the mid-1980s
Rusty n Edie's BBS – raided by the FBI in 1993 and sued by Playboy in 1997
SDF Public Access Unix System - Started in 1987 as an ANIME SIG and continues to run as sdf.org 
SF Net – was a coin-operated BBS accessible from select coffee shops located throughout the San Francisco Bay Area
SMTH BBS – The largest BBS in China, hosted by Tsinghua University
StarDoc 134 – DOS/Linux hybrid test BBS. Running modified ELEBBS software
The Brewers' Witch BBS – Texas-based BBS catering to Pagan and Neopagan discussion and community
TOTSE – Bay Area BBS known for large and often controversial selection of text files and internet discussion forum

See also
 List of BBS software
 List of artscene groups
 Boardwatch Magazine
 FidoNet

Further reading 
 via the Internet Archive.

References

External links
 BBS: The Documentary

TEXTFILES.COM Historical BBS List - A collection of BBS numbers from the past 20 Years
 Roblist - An article on (and extract of) "Roblist", the de facto BBS list for South Africa active until 1996.
 Telnet BBS Guide - The largest active listing of Telnet accessible Bulletin Board Systems on the Internet (since 1997)
bbs-scene.org bbs list active boards circa 2013 (via Wayback Machine)

Bulletin board systems
Internet culture